Jalen Thomas Brooks (born October 11, 2001) is an American actor. He is known for his recurring roles on Rebel and Animal Kingdom. He currently plays Colton on The CW's Walker.

Early life and education
Jalen Thomas Brooks was born on October 11, 2001. Brooks was raised in Las Vegas, Nevada where he attended Liberty High School in Henderson, Nevada and played basketball as a freshman. However, he soon turned to acting. Brooks began taking acting classes at DreamTraxx Acting Academy in Vegas.

Career
In 2019, Brooks made his television debut in an episode of The CW's Supergirl. Fresh off a recurring role as Blaise on TNT's Animal Kingdom, Brooks was cast in the recurring role of Sean in ABC's Rebel on February 9, 2021. While the series was short lived, Brooks appeared in 8 out of the 10 episodes. On October 22, 2021, it was announced that Brooks had been cast as Colton Davidson on The CW's Walker. At the time, Brooks had just wrapped Rebel and he was looking to take a break when his manager urged him to audition for Walker instead. He was shocked when he booked the gig and said "It was honestly the best decision in my life, just to do it." Having grown up on Supernatural, the actor was excited to work opposite Jared Padalecki and fellow Supernatural alumni, Mitch Pileggi. Brooks had briefly met his Walker co-star Odette Annable when they both worked on Supergirl. Brooks would appear in 20 episodes of the series. In 2023, Brooks was cast as the lead in Eli Roth's Thanksgiving.

Filmography

Film

Television

References

External links
 

2001 births
Living people
American male television actors
Male actors from Las Vegas
21st-century American male actors